Pseudoalteromonas prydzensis is a marine bacterium isolated from Antarctic sea ice.

References

External links
Type strain of Pseudoalteromonas prydzensis at BacDive -  the Bacterial Diversity Metadatabase

Alteromonadales
Bacteria described in 1998